Earle Lewis Ovington (December 20, 1879 – July 21, 1936) was an American aeronautical engineer, aviator and inventor, and served as a lab assistant to Thomas Edison.  Ovington piloted the first official airmail flight in the United States in a Blériot XI on September 23, 1911. He carried a sack of mail from Nassau Boulevard aerodrome, Garden City, New York to Mineola, New York. He circled at 500 feet and tossed the bag over the side of the cockpit and the sack burst on impact, scattering letters and postcards.  He delivered 640 letters and 1,280 postcards, including a letter to himself from the United States Post Office Department designating him as "Official Air Mail Pilot #1."

Biography
He was born on December 20, 1879 in Chicago, Illinois. He married Adelaide in 1911 and they had two children: Earle Kester Ovington (1912–2006) and Audrey Ovington (1914-2005) He built a house in the Samarkand area of Santa Barbara, California which included an airstrip.  While this airstrip wasn't the ultimate site of the Santa Barbara Municipal Airfield, it did serve in that capacity until Ovington's death.  He died on July 21, 1936. He was cremated and his ashes were scattered at sea.

See also

 1911 in aviation
 Dean Smith, pioneer air mail pilot

References

External links
Ovington, Mrs. Adelaide Alexander, An Aviator's Wife, Dodd, Mead and company, 1920. Full text at archive.org.
Campbell, Robert D., Reminiscences of a Birdman, Living History Press, 2009. 
Earle Lewis Ovington at Flickr
picture of Earle Lewis Ovington by photographer James Walter Collinge: last picture in gallery

1879 births
1936 deaths
20th-century American inventors
American aerospace engineers
Aviators from Illinois
United States airmail pilots